Pushpa: The Rise – Part 01 is a 2021 Indian Telugu-language action drama film written and directed by Sukumar. It stars Allu Arjun as the titular character alongside Fahadh Faasil (his Telugu debut), and Rashmika Mandanna while Jagadeesh Prathap Bandari, Sunil, Raj Tirandasu, Rao Ramesh, Dhananjaya, Anasuya Bharadwaj, Ajay and Ajay Ghosh play supporting roles. It is produced by Mythri Movie Makers in association with Muttamsetty Media. The first of two cinematic parts, the film depicts the rise of a low wage laborer Pushpa Raj in the smuggling syndicate of red sandalwood, a rare wood that grows only in the Seshachalam Hills of Chittoor in Andhra Pradesh state.

Devi Sri Prasad composed the film's score and soundtrack while the cinematography and editing are performed by Miroslaw Kuba Brozek and Karthika Srinivas–Ruben respectively. The film began its production in December 2019 but was halted in March 2020 by the COVID-19 pandemic. Filming resumed in November 2020 and ended in November 2021, predominantly taking place at the Ramoji Film City in Hyderabad and Maredumilli forest in Andhra Pradesh.

Pushpa: The Rise was released on 17 December 2021. The film received generally mixed  reviews from critics, who praised the performances (particularly of Allu Arjun, Sunil and Fahadh Faasil), action choreography, cinematography, direction, and soundtrack but criticised the runtime, writing, and editing. The film was commercially successful, grossing – crore at the box office. The film emerged as the highest-grossing Indian film in 2021, and ranks among the highest-grossing Telugu films of all time.

A sequel titled Pushpa: The Rule – Part 02  is under production in late 2023 which is scheduled to release in early 2024.

Plot 
In the 1990s, Pushpa Raj, a labourer, decides to smuggle red sandalwood, a rare wood in high demand that only grows in the Seshachalam Hills of the Chittoor district in Andhra Pradesh with his friend sidekick Keshava. When DSP Govindappa and his team raid the forest for apprehending the coolies and seize the stock, Pushpa hides it, gets arrested and brutally beaten for revealing the location of wood. Pushpa's employer, smuggler Konda Reddy and his brothers bail Pushpa out for the stock's location and he eventually rises through the ranks by suggesting novel ideas to smuggle the stock earning Konda Reddy's trust and becoming his 5% partner, while also simultaneously receiving hatred from Konda Reddy's youngest brother Jolly Reddy.

Managalam Srinu, Konda Reddy's boss and a big criminal known for his cruelty and oppression, manages the syndicate and entrusts Konda Reddy to keep 200 tons of his contraband safe from the Police Department. As Jolly Reddy is deemed incompetent for task, Pushpa is assigned to do the same. Jolly Reddy intentionally delays the export of wood putting Pushpa in a perplexed condition as Govindappa is about to raid the place. Pushpa throws all the logs into a nearby river while Keshava bribes the chief engineer of the neighboring dam to close its gates preventing the logs from flowing and Govindappa gains nothing with the raid for second time. Srinu hosts a party on this occasion and during the festivity, Pushpa overhears the conversation of two people discussing Srinu's scams and realizes that he sells wood at much higher price than what they are paid. He informs it to Konda Reddy suggesting him to demand a fair share from Srinu but gives up when going against a highly influential Srinu seems risky.

Meanwhile, Pushpa falls in love with a brave and outspoken milk seller Srivalli, who is the daughter of a coolie Muniratnam, who is also indulged in smuggling like Pushpa and eventually, an engagement is arranged for them. During the ceremony, Pushpa's elder half-brother Mohan creates a scene, condemns Pushpa for using their father's name to fix his marriage with Srivalli as Pushpa was born out of wedlock to Pushpa's father and mother Parvatamma, who is not legally married. During the scuffle, Parvatamma is wounded and her miseries motivate Pushpa to make himself an influential personality. He smuggles the wood directly to Chennai bypassing Srinu and later meets the latter demanding a higher price than what is paid but when rejected and ordered to be beaten, Pushpa revolts, goes to Chennai and cuts deal with the customer Murugan for 1.5 crores per tonne which Konda Reddy and Pushpa agree to share equally. Govindappa detains Muniratnam while smuggling the wood and threatens him to be a mole. Jolly Reddy, who lusts for Srivalli learns about Muniratnam's deceit and blackmails Srivalli to have sex with him in exchange of her father's freedom, holding him captive.

Srivalli reveals about this to Pushpa, who furiously beats Jolly Reddy and putting him in a paralyzed state. When Jolly Reddy refuses to reveal about the person behind his condition to his brothers as he wants it to be avenged by himself, Konda Reddy, himself finds that Pushpa is responsible for it. He attempts to murder Pushpa but Srinu's men led by his brother-in-law Mogileesu attack them and assassinate Konda Reddy. Pushpa rescues Konda Reddy's younger brother Jakka Reddy rekindling their friendship and murders Srinu's brother-in-law Mogileesu. MP Bhumireddy Siddappa Naidu arranges a truce between Pushpa and Srinu and after discovering about the latter's scams, he appoints Pushpa to replace Srinu. As time pass by, Pushpa becomes an influential person and took the control of the entire syndicate. While Srinu's wife Dakshayani injures Srinu and berates his inability to protest against Pushpa.

While Pushpa is at his prime, Bhanwar Singh Shekawat, an egoistic police officer, takes charge as the district's SP. Pushpa offers a bribe to Bhanwar for cooperation but the Bhanwar ridicules Pushpa for his parents' story and his motives for that are to make Pushpa call him "sir". After this incident, Pushpa turns meek and submissive towards Bhanwar, who regularly receives bribes from him. Pushpa, on the day of his marriage spends partying with Bhanwar alone where he converses about the past incident and Bhanwar's humiliating conduct. Pushpa seizes Bhanwar's gun and forces him to be semi-naked while Pushpa also does the same, intending to explain that he is the same without clothes while Bhanwar is nothing without his uniform and even his pet dog would not identify him. Pushpa returns to the wedding hall while an insulted Bhanwar walks home, semi-naked, and his dog fails to identify him without uniform. Enraged, Bhanwar kills the dog and burns the bribe sent by Pushpa, swearing revenge. While Pushpa marries Srivalli, telling her that the actual story has begun.

Cast

Production

Development 
Post the success of Rangasthalam (2018), Sukumar narrated a script to Mahesh Babu, with whom he previously worked in 1: Nenokkadine (2014). Babu, who liked the story, gave a nod to the project, and was reported to start the shoot after completing Vamshi Paidipally's project Maharshi (2019). In mid-April 2019, Mythri Movie Makers, which collaborated with Sukumar in their previous film Rangasthalam, officially announced the project which was tentatively titled as #SSMB26, thus marking their second collaboration with Babu and Sukumar. The film was expected to begin in January 2019, but, in that March, Babu walked out of Sukumar's project citing creative differences, and he confirmed this through Twitter. The actor instead signed his next project with Anil Ravipudi titled as Sarileru Neekevvaru, whereas Sukumar approached Allu Arjun for his next marking his reunion with the director after a decade since Arya 2 (2009), Mythri Movie Makers which earlier associated with Babu and Sukumar's project also agreed to produce the venture.

Sukamar narrated Babu a story based on red-sanders. However, once the project was shelved, he came up with a different storyline on red sanders for Allu Arjun. Speaking with Press Trust of India, Sukumar said: "with Mahesh Babu, I couldn’t make him cool. He is very fair. So, the backdrop was the same but the story is different."

Pre-production 

Sukumar described the storyline as, "the red sanders heist in the hills of Andhra is a convoluted nexus that unfurls in the course of the narrative through a coolie-turned-smuggler." Sukumar explored the subject of red sandalwood smuggling when he read about such incidents in Andhra Pradesh years ago. Sukumar did his research and thought of developing the project as a web series. However, he later decided to make it as a feature film. He personally went for location scouting across Nallamala Forest as the film is set in Rayalaseema and Nellore and the plot revolves around red sanders smuggling. Since most of the film takes place in a rural backdrop, Allu Arjun was reported to master Chittoor accent for the film, and the makers hired a team from Bollywood to work on his look. The story was set against the backdrop of Seshachalam forest, located in the hilly region of Tirumala. Polish cinematographer Miroslaw Kuba Brozek, who worked for Nani's Gangleader (2019) was signed for the film. Karthika Srinivas is performing the film's editing, whereas Mounika and Ramakrishna, the art directors of Sukumar's previous film Rangasthalam (2018) were chosen for production design. Resul Pookutty is signed for the film's sound design, along with Vijay Kumar.  The film's title Pushpa was officially announced on 8 April 2020, on the occasion of Allu Arjun's birthday and a poster was also released.

Casting 
Allu Arjun played the titular character Pushpa Raj, a red-sanders smuggler, and sported a bearded look for his role in the film. Rashmika Mandanna was cast as the film's lead actress, with an official announcement made on Allu Arjun's birthday (8 April 2019). Mandanna in an online interaction confirmed that she will be learning a new dialect for the film, which is slightly based on the accent of Chittoor. Jisshu Sengupta was originally offered to play the antagonist but he refused due to pandemic and time constraint.  Vijay Sethupathi entered in talks to play the antagonist in October 2019, after working with Sukumar in the director's production venture Uppena (2021), and was confirmed to be part of the film in January 2020. However, in July 2020, Sethupathi left the film citing scheduling conflicts. Post Sethupathi's exit, Vikram, Bobby Simha, Madhavan and Arya were reported to play negative roles in the film, but Malayalam actor Fahadh Faasil was announced as the film's antagonist in March 2021, . For his role in the film, Fahadh sported a bald look and a rough moustache.

Kannada actor Dhananjaya was reported to play a pivotal role in April 2020. Jagapathi Babu and Prakash Raj were signed to play key roles in the film. In November 2020, Sunil was cast in a supporting role and was present in the film's second schedule along with Harish Uthaman, and Vennela Kishore. Sunil's character was reported to have grey shades in the film. Though it was reported that Anasuya Bharadwaj was playing a crucial role, she later clarified that she wasn't approached for the film. However, Bharadwaj joined the film shooting in April 2021. In July 2021, Sritej confirmed that he was cast in the role of Pushpa Raj's brother. The film had three antagonists, with Sunil and Anasuya, being the antagonists in the first part, while Fahadh's character, Bhanwar Singh Shekhawat, the main antagonist, will appear only at the end of the first part and will continue throughout its sequel. Jagadeesh was cast by Sukumar after watching his performances in the films Mallesham (2019) and George Reddy (2019). In an interview, Jagadeesh Prathap Bandari revealed that he has left 15 smaller projects for working in the film. Samantha joined the production in late-November 2021. She has shot for the item song "Oo Antava Oo Oo Antava" alongside Allu Arjun and others. On working in the song, she said that "being sexy is next level hard work".

Filming 
In July 2019, the makers planned to start the filming during the occasion of Dusshera (7 October 2019). However, the launch event of the film took place on 30 October 2019, with a formal puja ceremony held in Hyderabad at the office of Mythri Movie Makers, with the film's cast and crew being present at the event. In December 2019, Sukumar performed a test shoot in Kerala's Athirappilly Falls. After Allu Arjun's involvement in the promotions of Ala Vaikunthapurramuloo (2020), the makers planned to shoot the first schedule of the film in Kerala in March 2020, with Arjun joining the schedule, however, the filming was halted due to COVID-19 pandemic in India.

For a 6-minute action sequence in the film, the team planned to hire action choreographers from South India, instead of opting for foreign technicians. Thus, the film became a "Make In India" project, an initiative to provide employment to the workers from the Indian Film Industry, after some technicians faced employment crisis due to the pandemic.

The makers later planned to shift the location from Kerala to Andhra Pradesh, due to restrictions on travel, in order to curb the COVID-19 pandemic. In June 2020, the makers planned to resume the shoot in Ramoji Film City in Hyderabad, and later planned to shoot the film at Nalgonda. Post government permitted film shootings with minimal crew, the makers resumed filming on 10 November 2020 in Maredumilli forest in Andhra Pradesh, and completed within 14 days. The team moved to Rajahmundry in December 2020 to shoot key sequences, but was indefinitely postponed to January 2021, as twelve crew members working in the film were diagnosed with COVID-19. The shooting later resumed in January 2021 and the production house tweeted that two schedules at Rampachodavaram and Maredumilli was completed within February 2021. The team also finished a schedule at Kerala in March 2021.

The shooting of the film was put on hold due to restrictions following second wave of COVID-19 pandemic in India, and Allu Arjun was also diagnosed with COVID-19 in late April. The team resumed the final leg shooting on 6 July 2021, with a major schedule was filmed in Secunderabad, but came to a halt on 24 July 2021 when Sukumar was diagnosed with dengue fever. The filming resumed after Sukumar recovered from the disease. On 22 August 2021, Fahadh Faasil joined the shooting schedule of the film. After wrapping her portions in the Hindi film Goodbye, Rashmika joined the shoot for filming her portions. In September 2021, she rejoined the shoot after a brief break. On 8 September, Allu Arjun headed to Maredumilli to film the final schedule. After a month-long production, on 4 October, the team started shooting face off scenes between Allu Arjun and Fahadh Faasil. Finally, a special song featuring Samantha was filmed in November 2021 at a specially constructed set at the Ramoji Film City and "Ey Bidda Idi Na Adda" song, was Arjun filmed at Mallikarjun swami mandir of Beeramguda. After this, the film entered into the full-fledged post-production phase.

Speaking to the media at a promotional event of Tamil version in Chennai, Allu Arjun said that "We had about 400-500 cars in the forest that would take us from point A to B. In some places, there were no roads and we had to create a pathway with whatever was available. The filming itself took us almost two years, that is why I say this: the effort we had put in for Pushpa is equal to four films."

Post-production 
The dubbing works of the film have begun in April 2021. Ten days before the release of the film, Shreyas Talpade confirmed that he has dubbed for Allu Arjun of the film's Hindi version. Jis Joy who has dubbed for Arjun's previous films in Malayalam, has been signed to voice dub for Allu Arjun of the film's Malayalam version. By the early-December 2021 he has completed his portions of dubbing. K. P. Sekar lent Allu Arjun's voice for the film's Tamil version. Fahadh Faasil has dubbed for his role in all the languages, except Hindi which is dubbed by Rajesh Khattar.

Music 

Sukumar's regular collaborator Devi Sri Prasad composed score and soundtrack of this film. The soundtrack features five singers written by Chandrabose, including "Daakko Daakko Meka", "Srivalli", "Oo Antava Oo Oo Antava", "Saami Saami", and "Eyy Bidda Idhi Naa Adda".

Release 
The film was screened at the Moscow International Film Festival in 2022. It was screened in the category "Blockbuster hits from around the world".

Theatrical 
Pushpa: The Rise was released on 17 December 2021. Previously, the film was announced to release on 13 August 2021, coinciding with the Independence Day weekend. In May 2021, the makers announced that the film would be releasing in two parts, with the first part coming on the originally intended release date while the second installment will be arriving in 2022. The producers released a statement saying: "The storyline and the characters took on lives of their own and grew to a span that required the movie to be released in two parts", with the title of the film's first part was unveiled as Pushpa: The Rise – Part 1 in August 2021. Due to surge in the COVID-19 pandemic, the film's release was rescheduled to Christmas 2021. In October 2021, the makers announced the release date as 17 December 2021. It simultaneously released in Telugu and dubbed versions in Tamil, Kannada , Malayalam and Hindi languages.

Following the release, the makers deleted a controversial scene on fans' demand. In the scene, Pushpa (played by Arjun) touches Srivalli's (played by Mandanna) chest and have a conversation about it, and they felt it may not go well with the family audience. It is also reported that a few more scenes were cut to reduce its runtime.

In later half of 2022, it got officially dubbed in Russian, the production company released Russian-language trailer on YouTube on 29 November 2022 and the film will be release in theatres of Russia.

Distribution 
Initially Karan Johar's Dharma Productions were reported to acquire the distribution rights, and may present and promote the Hindi version of the film in North Indian theatres. This was reported to be third South Indian film to be presented by the company after the Baahubali franchise and 2.0 (2018). However, it was reported that the film's Hindi version will not have a be simultaneous theatre release, instead the Hindi dubbed version will release directly on YouTube. It has been reported that, the Hindi version faced troubles due to the legal disputes between the producers and Goldmines Telefilms, which regularly distributed the Hindi versions of the actor's previous films. However, in November 2021, a Hindi-version poster was later released, thus clarifying that the film will have theatrical release in Hindi. In the same month it was also reported that the Goldmines Telefilms will distribute the film in the Hindi-version by collaborating with another production company. On 20 November 2021, it was confirmed through social media that the Hindi distribution would be done by AA Films. The film is distributed in Tamil Nadu by Lyca Productions and Sri Lakshmi Movies, Swagath Enterprises in Karnataka and by E4 Entertainments in Kerala.

Home media 
Star India Network acquired the satellite rights of the film (except the Hindi version, which was acquired by Goldmines TV), while Amazon Prime Video acquired the digital rights. The film began streaming 21 days later through Amazon Prime Video on 7 January 2022, while the Hindi version began streaming from 14 January 2022.

Reception

Critical response 
Bollywood Hungama gave it 3.5/5 rating, noting it as a "Paisa Vasool" film and called Sukumar's screenplay "top notch." The Indian Express gave it 3 out of 5 stars and wrote "Allu Arjun walks away with the film with his strong performance. He embraces his deglamorized look and delivers a memorable performance". Deccan Chronicle gave the film 3 out of 5 stars, and called it a "one-man show" referring to lead actor Allu Arjun. The reviewer added that the latter half was predictable and Sami Sami song appears without context with the climax lacking punch. A reviewer from Pinkvilla gave the film 3 out of 5 stars praising Allu's performance and soundtrack writing, "'Pushpa: The Rise' needed smarter writing for sure. But it's still one of the most engaging mass masala films in recent times. Devi Sri Prasad's superb songs hit the ball out of the park". The Times of India critic Neeshita Nyayapati rated the film 3 out of 5 stars and praised Allu's performance, action sequences, direction, cinematography and score but criticised the technical aspects while stating: "Pushpa: The Rise is Allu Arjun’s show all the way. He shines in playing this rustic character that is hard on the surface but vulnerable in ways that others don’t see." Rating the film 3/5, India Today critic Janani K. praised Allu and Sunil's performances but felt that Mandanna was in the film "only for the male gaze". On technical aspects, she appreciated cinematography and editing but criticised Sukumar's screenplay, calling it "one of the weakest screenplay of his career."

Haricharan Pudipeddi of Hindustan Times called it "Ahaa Oho", writing, "At three-hour-long, Pushpa manages to stay engaging for the most part and never makes sitting through the film tiring. It’s a character-driven story and Sukumar needs to be lauded for effectively establishing the character of Pushpa, whose growth couldn’t have been handled more satisfyingly." News18 praised the performances, action sequences and soundtrack writing "Overall, the film is a massy entertainer with a decent storyline and is custom-made for Allu Arjun’s fans." Reviewing the Hindi dubbed version, Komal Nahata praised Arjun's acting and Shreyas Talpade's Hindi dubbing of Pushpa character. Praising the work of cast and crew, a reviewer from Eenadu opined that Sukumar should have re-thought about the runtime and spent more time in the post-production. In ABP Newss review, Ravi Bule felt that the story was not fresh but by the style it was expressed its new. Writing for The News Minute, Sowmya Rajendran said: "Allu Arjun is immensely likable on screen and that keeps Pushpa going despite its lengthy runtime of three hours." Also opining that the film was a bit long, Firstpost Sankeertana Varma said: "Sukumar has a vision for who Pushpa is, both the character and the film." Calling it a "mixed bag," Sangeetha Devi Dundoo of The Hindu, wrote, "Pushpa – The Rise is riveting in some segments and bland in others. Allu Arjun shoulders the film, but his coming together with Sukumar should have been for a more absorbing narrative."

The Hans India rated the film 2.75 out of 5 stars and wrote "The first half is quite engaging but the second half moves at a snail pace and bores us to the core. Barring Allu Arjun's exceptional performance, there is nothing else to watch out for in Pushpa". Karthik Keramalu of The Quint rated the film 2.5 out of 5 stars and wrote "The meat of the story doesn’t have enough protein to sustain a sequel. Sukumar could have easily wrapped up everything in this movie itself. And now we’ll have to sit through three more hours of Shekhawat versus Pushpa". Anji Shetty of Sakshi appreciated the red sandalwood backdrop and Allu's characterisation but felt that the story was predictable and the climax with Fahadh was a disappointment.  In her review for BBC Telugu, Sahiti stated Sukumar deviated from his usual style of filmmaking and opted for flat narrative in Pushpa which was one of the film's downsides. A News 18 Hindi reviewer also felt the same. She added Mandanna's role was very dull and director doesn't dwell onto how ordinary kid like Pushpa grows up to a goon of his village.

Box office 
Including the premieres, the film grossed $850,000 in the United States and obtained a worldwide gross of 74 crore on its first day. Pushpa grossed over  crore worldwide in its opening weekend. It netted over 107.5 crore in three days, making it the first 100 crore weekend in India post-COVID-19 pandemic. Overall, its the 13th film and fourth South India film to achieve this feat. Box Office India reported that the opening would have been higher, if not for the ticket pricing issue in Andhra Pradesh state. An article from The Indian Express analysed the losses incurred by The Rise due to low ticket prices in Andhra. "Pushpa collected a [distributor's] share of a little more than 13 crore from the state’s 1100 screens. To put this in perspective, in Telangana, the first-day share of Pushpa was pegged at over 11 crore from around 600-odd screens," the article stated.

The film's Hindi dubbed version is commercially successful. The Rise Hindi version netted 26.50 crore in its first week, and over 62 crore by the end of third weekend. The Rise netted over  crore in India in two weeks, and became the seventh South India film and the second Allu Arjun film after Ala Vaikunthapurramuloo (2020) to do so. The film grossed  crore worldwide from all versions by the end of the third weekend, and emerged as the highest grossing Indian film in 2021. The scale of the dub's commercial gains have been considered unusual, especially as the film was also available on streaming platforms during its Hindi theatrical run. Its success, as well as the popularity of other Telugu films dubbed into Hindi, has been mainly attributed to the film's mass appeal as a masala film during a time when Hindi cinema has focused more on realism and has become more "toned down".

Accolades

Issues

Copyright 
Sukumar and the makers were accused of copyright infringement by the writer Vempalli Gangadhar. In a Facebook post dated 27 August 2020, Gangadhar stated that the storyline which is based on red sandalwood smuggling, was plagiarised from his short story titled Tamil Coolie written for Sakshi newspaper which was published two years earlier.

Lawsuit 
In December 2021, a lawsuit was filed at a court in Andhra Pradesh against a song in the film titled "Oo Antava Mava Oo Oo Antava" by a certain men's association. According to them, the song portrayed men as casanovas and eve teasers as its lyrics seemingly mock the male gaze. They also asked for a ban on the song.

Sequel 
Initially planned as a single film, it was later decided to make the film a two-part release. The second part titled Pushpa 2: The Rule is planning to release in December 2023 or March 2024, as announced by Sukumar. The second part will continue from the first part's story.

Although few scenes of Pushpa – Part 2: The Rule were already filmed, director Sukumar announced he will re-shoot the entire film, as the initial script was altered to cater more to the audience in the Hindi belt due to the unexpected success of the first film in those regions. Principal photography of the film is originally scheduled in February 2022 and later it was also reported that the filming will begin in April 2022.  Later, in January 2022, Mandanna confirmed that she will join the production in March 2022.

See also 
Crime fiction - Genre of fiction focusing on crime 
2015 sandalwood smugglers encounter in Andhra Pradesh
Organised crime in India
Smuggling

Notes

References

External links 
 
 
 
 

2020s Telugu-language films
2021 action drama films
2021 films
Action films based on actual events
Fictional portrayals of the Andhra Pradesh Police
Fictional portrayals of the Tamil Nadu Police
Film productions suspended due to the COVID-19 pandemic
Films about corruption in India
Films about criminals
Films about organised crime in India
Films directed by Sukumar
Films involved in plagiarism controversies
Films scored by Devi Sri Prasad
Films set in Andhra Pradesh
Films set in forests
Films shot at Ramoji Film City
Films shot in Andhra Pradesh
Films shot in Hyderabad, India
Films shot in Kerala
Films shot in Thrissur
Films shot in Chalakudy
Illegal logging in India
Indian action drama films
Indian crime action films
Indian neo-noir films
2020s masala films
Mythri Movie Makers films